Douglas F. Kelly (born September 23, 1943) is a theologian and taught systematic theology at the Reformed Theological Seminary in Jackson and is currently an honorary professor. He worked with David F. Wright at the University of Edinburgh as editor-in-chief of Calvin's Old Testament commentary. He received his B.A. from the University of North Carolina, Diploma from the University of Lyon, his B.D. from the Union Theological Seminary, and Ph.D.(systematic theology) from the University of Edinburgh. He has written many books and is Richard Jordan Professor of Systematic Theology at Reformed Theological Seminary in Charlotte, N.C. Notable books include If God Already Knows, Why Pray?,  Systematic Theology, The Westminster Confession of Faith, and Christian Ministry Today: Studies in II Corinthians. He translated Sermons by John Calvin on II Samuel. He is serving with David F. Wright of the University of Edinburgh as a general editor for a revision of Calvin’s Old Testament Commentaries.  He was also enlisted to serve on the Jurisprudence project of The Christian Legal Society and serves on the Credentials Committee of the Central Carolina Presbytery.

Education  
He holds qualifications from these institutions:
 University of North Carolina, Chapel Hill, B.A.
 University of Lyon, Diplome
 Union Theological Seminary, B.D.
 University of Edinburgh, Ph.D.

Bibliography 
He has written the following books with several different publishers:
 Systematic Theology, Vol 1: Grounded in Holy Scripture and Understood in the Light of the Church: The God Who Is: The Holy Trinity (Mentor, US 2009 & UK 2008)
 Systematic Theology, Vol 2: The Beauty of Christ - a Trinitarian Vision (Mentor, 2014)
 If God Already Knows, Why Pray? (Christian Focus, 2005)
 Creation and Change: Genesis 1:1-2:4 in the Light of Changing Scientific Paradigms (Mentor, 2003)
 Preachers with Power: Four Stalwarts of the South (Banner of Truth, 1994)
 Carolina Scots: An Historical and Genealogical Study of Over 100 Years of Immigration (Seventeen Thirty Nine Publications, 1998)
 Christian Ministry Today: Studies in II Corinthians
 Emergence of Liberty in the Modern World: Five Calvinist Governments from the 16th to 18th centuries (P&R, 1992)
 An English Translation of John Calvin’s Sermons on II Samuel 1-13 (Banner of Truth, 1992)
 The Westminster Confession of Faith: An Authentic Modern Version [authored jointly with Professor Phil Rollinson and Dr. Hugh McClure] (P&R, 1986)
 A Theological Guide to Calvin’s Institutes – Chapter 4: The True and Triune God: Calvin’s Doctrine of the Holy Trinity (P&R, 2008)
 Revelation: A Mentor Expository Commentary (Mentor, 2015)
 Creation And Change: Genesis 1:1-2.4 in the Light of Changing Scientific Paradigms (Revised Version) (Mentor, 2017)

References

American Christian theologians
Living people
Date of birth missing (living people)
Alumni of the University of Edinburgh
University of Lyon alumni
University of North Carolina at Chapel Hill alumni
Union Theological Seminary (New York City) alumni
1943 births